Vanur is a state assembly constituency in Viluppuram district of Tamil Nadu, India. Its State Assembly Constituency number is 73. The seat is reserved for candidates from the Scheduled Castes and comprises Vanur taluk and a portion of Viluppuram taluk. It is a part of the Viluppuram constituency for national elections to the Parliament of India. It is one of the 234 State Legislative Assembly Constituencies in Tamil Nadu, in India.

Madras State

Tamil Nadu

Election results

2021

2016

2011

2006

2001

1996

1991

1989

1984

1980

1977

1971

1967

1962

References 

 

Assembly constituencies of Tamil Nadu
Viluppuram district